Portraits is a concept album by Breton band Tri Yann. It was released in 1995 under the Déclic label.

All the songs on the album are about a historical person. Some, like the tracks in honor of Brian Boru and Gerry Adams, are purely instrumental, while some contain Old French lyrics. The last third of the songs in the album concern Guillaume Seznec.

The album was recorded at l'Abbaye Royale de Fontevraud. It also marks the arrival of Christophe Le Helley into the group, which would give the band a more medieval sound, as well as a rare appearance by former member Bernard Baudriller.

Track listing
 Marie-Camille Lehuédé
 Madeleine Bernard
 Gerry Adams
Arthur Plantagenest
 Goulven Salaün
 Olivier Herry
 Brian Boru
 Aloïda
Anne de Bretagne

Guillaume Seznec
 Le Voyage
 Le Procès
 L'Adieu
 Le Bagne
 La Délivrance
 Seznec est innocent!

1995 albums
Tri Yann albums